Gillian Boag (born 19 February 1995) is a Canadian rugby union player.

Boag competed for Canada at the delayed 2021 Rugby World Cup in New Zealand. She featured in the knockout stages against the United States, and England; and in the third place final against France.

References 

Living people
1995 births
Female rugby union players
Canadian female rugby union players
Canada women's international rugby union players